Protect the Innocent is the second album by American singer Rachel Sweet. It was released on February 15, 1980 and was issued by Stiff Records and Columbia Records. The album was produced by Martin Rushent and Alan Winstanley, with the latter also handling engineering.

Critical reception

In a 1980 review, Billboard noted the "good production and musicianship" on Protect the Innocent and found that the album shows that Sweet "has possibilities beyond the new wave audience." Critic Robert Christgau likened her to "a new-wave Linda Ronstadt" and was less receptive, citing Sweet's self-penned "Tonight Ricky" as the album's only interesting song.

Track listing

Charts

References

External links
 
 

1980 albums
Albums produced by Martin Rushent
Albums produced by Alan Winstanley
Albums recorded at Morgan Sound Studios
Stiff Records albums
Columbia Records albums